Alexandra Barré (born January 29, 1958) is a Hungarian-born Canadian sprint kayaker who competed in the mid-1980s to the early 2000s. She won two medals at the 1984 Summer Olympics in Los Angeles with a silver in the K-2 500 m event and a bronze in the K-4 500 m event.

Barré's husband Denis, competed as a canoer for Canada in two Summer Olympics, earning his best finish of eighth in the K-2 1000 m event at Montreal in 1976. Their daughter, Mylanie, has also competed in two Summer Olympics of her own, earning her best finish of seventh in the K-2 500 m event at Athens in 2004.

References
 

1958 births
Canadian female canoeists
Canoeists at the 1984 Summer Olympics
Hungarian emigrants to Canada
Living people
Olympic canoeists of Canada
Olympic silver medalists for Canada
Olympic bronze medalists for Canada
Canoeists from Budapest
Sportspeople from Quebec
Olympic medalists in canoeing
Medalists at the 1984 Summer Olympics